Saint Andrew's Episcopal Church, or variants thereof, may refer to:

United States

Alabama
 St. Andrew's Episcopal Church (Birmingham, Alabama), listed on the NRHP
 St. Andrew's Episcopal Church (Prairieville, Alabama), National Historic Landmark and listed on the NRHP

Arkansas
 Saint Andrew's Episcopal Church (Mammoth Spring, Arkansas), listed on the NRHP in Fulton County, Arkansas

California
St. Andrew's Episcopal Church, Saratoga, founder of Saint Andrew's School, Saratoga, California

Colorado
 St. Andrew's Episcopal Church (Denver, Colorado), listed on the NRHP in downtown Denver, Colorado

Connecticut
 St. Andrew's Episcopal Church (Stamford, Connecticut), listed on the NRHP
 St. Andrew's Episcopal Church (Washington, Connecticut), listed on the NRHP

Florida
 St. Andrew's Episcopal Church (Fort Pierce, Florida). Its original building was moved to become Holy Apostles Episcopal Church
St. Andrew's Episcopal Church (Jacksonville), listed on the NRHP
St. Andrew's Episcopal Church (Tampa, Florida), listed on the NRHP

Georgia
 St. Andrew's Episcopal Church (Darien, Georgia)

Idaho
 St. Andrew's Episcopal Church (Mullan, Idaho), listed on the NRHP in Shoshone County, Idaho

Iowa
 St. Andrew's Episcopal Church (Waverly, Iowa)

Kansas
 St. Andrew's Episcopal Church (Emporia, Kansas)

Louisiana
 St. Andrew's Episcopal Church (Clinton, Louisiana), listed on the NRHP

Maryland
 St. Andrew's Episcopal Chapel (Sudlersville, Maryland), listed on the NRHP

Massachusetts
 St. Andrew's Episcopal Church (Hanover, Massachusetts), one of the oldest parishes in the Episcopal Diocese of Massachusetts

Michigan
 Saint Andrew's Memorial Episcopal Church, Detroit, Michigan

Missouri
 St. Andrew's Episcopal Church (Kansas City, Missouri)

New Hampshire
 St. Andrew's-by-the-Sea, Rye, New Hampshire, listed on the NRHP

New York
 St. Andrew's Episcopal Church (Albany, New York), listed on the NRHP in Albany, New York
 St. Andrew's Episcopal Church (Brewster, New York), listed on the NRHP
 St. Andrew's Episcopal Church (Buffalo, New York), listed on the NRHP
 St. Andrew's Episcopal Church (New York City), listed on the NRHP
 Saint Andrew's Episcopal Church (Rochester, New York), listed on the NRHP
 St. Andrew's Episcopal Church (Walden, New York), listed on the NRHP
 St. Andrew's Episcopal Church (Yaphank, New York), listed on the NRHP

North Carolina
 St. Andrew's Episcopal Church and Cemetery, Woodleaf, listed on the NRHP in Rowan County, North Carolina
 St. Andrew's On-The-Sound Episcopal Church, Wilmington, NC
 St. Andrew's By-The-Sea (Nags Head, North Carolina) Episcopal Church, Nags Head, NC

Ohio
 St. Andrew's Episcopal Church (Elyria, Ohio), listed on the NRHP in Lorain County, Ohio

Pennsylvania
St. Andrew's Episcopal Church (Pittsburgh, Allegheny County, Pennsylvania)

Rhode Island
 St. Andrew's Episcopal Chapel (Woonsocket, Rhode Island), listed on the NRHP

South Carolina
 Old St. Andrew's Parish Church (Charleston, South Carolina) (ACNA), listed on the NRHP
 St. Andrew's Episcopal Church (Mount Pleasant, South Carolina) (ACNA), a historic district contributing property

South Dakota
 St. Andrew's Episcopal Church (Scotland, South Dakota), listed on the NRHP in South Dakota

Texas
 St. Andrew's Episcopal Church (Amarillo, Texas)
 Saint Andrew's Episcopal Church (Bryan, Texas), listed on the NRHP in Brazos County, Texas
 St. Andrew's Episcopal Church (Fort Worth, Texas) (ACNA)

Washington
 St. Andrew's Episcopal Church (Chelan, Washington), listed on the NRHP in Chelan County, Washington
 St. Andrew's Episcopal Church (Port Angeles, Washington), listed on the NRHP in Washington

See also
St. Andrew's Church (disambiguation)
St Andrew (disambiguation)
Episcopal Church (disambiguation)
Saint (disambiguation)
Andrew (disambiguation)